Louis Lafitte (November 15, 1770 in Paris – August 3, 1828 in Paris) was a French painter, designer, illustrator and muralist.

Biography 
He was the son of a master barber. In 1778, his father offered refuge to the painter Simon Mathurin Lantara, who was in desperate financial straits and, during his stay, Lantara excited young Lafitte's interest in painting. He also convinced Lafitte's father that his son had a gift for drawing, so he was sent to study with the engraver Gilles Demarteau then, in 1786, with  Jean-Baptiste Regnault. Later he was admitted to the Académie royale de peinture et de sculpture. 

In 1791, he won Prix de Rome for his painting of Regulus returning to Carthage and became the last painter sent to Rome during the reign of Louis XVI. He was living at the  Villa Medici in 1793, when protests against French incursions into Italy forced him to flee the Papal States and seek refuge in Florence, where he briefly taught at the Academy.

He returned to Paris in 1796 and was married later that year. Financial problems soon forced him to do decorative work and illustrations, including twelve allegories for the months in the French Republican Calendar. In 1800, he worked at the Château de Malmaison in collaboration with the architect Charles Percier. His work there featured eight Pompeian style dancers for the dining room. In 1809, the Sénat commissioned a monumental oil painting, depicting the establishment of the Cisalpine Republic, but he was unable to complete it successfully.

From 1807 to 1808, he worked with architect Jean Chalgrin, managing all the decorations for the Théâtre de l'Impératrice. The theater was gutted by fire in 1818, and his decorations survive only in written descriptions. The following year, he helped Chalgrin decorate a full-scale wood, stucco and canvas mockup of the proposed Arc de Triomphe. In 1811, he painted Romulus and Remus above the doors of the Sénat at the Palais du Luxembourg for the baptism of Napoléon François Charles Joseph Bonaparte. 

From 1800 to 1814, he created designs for the Manufacture de Sèvres. Then, from 1814 to 1816, he collaborated with Merry-Joseph Blondel in creating a collection of wallpapers based on the theme of Cupid and Psyche, from a story by Jean de La Fontaine. In 1816, taking advantage of a peaceful period, he visited London, where King George III commissioned him to create decorations for a celebration at Carlton House. 

In 1820, he designed decorations to commemorate the birth of the Duc de Bordeaux. In 1823, he was named a Knight in the Légion d'Honneur as a designer for the King's Cabinet. Two years later, he created his last major works for the coronation of Charles X.

He died after a brief illness and is buried in Père-Lachaise Cemetery. His remaining works were sold in an auction at his home.

References

Further reading 
 Marc Allègret, "Louis Lafitte, (1770–1828), peintre et dessinateur", in the Revue  du Souvenir Napoléonien, #439
 Jean Duchesne Aîné, "Notice sur la vie et les ouvrages de Monsieur Louis Lafitte", in Catalogue des tableaux, dessins, estampes, livres, médailles du cabinet de feu Mr Louis Lafitte, (Auction catalog) 1828.

External links 

 Works by Lafitte @ the Base Joconde.
 Works by Lafitte @ the Agence Photographique of the Réunion des Musées Nationaux

1770 births
1828 deaths
French history painters
French muralists
Prix de Rome for painting
French designers
French illustrators
French decorative artists
Artists from Paris
Recipients of the Legion of Honour
Burials at Père Lachaise Cemetery
French male painters